Lee Anthony Nicholls (born 5 October 1992) is an English professional footballer who plays as a goalkeeper for EFL Championship club Huddersfield Town.

Early life
Lee Nicholls was born in Huyton, Merseyside.

Club career

Wigan Athletic
Nicholls signed scholarship forms with Wigan Athletic in the summer of 2009. After a series of impressive performances for the reserve team, he appeared for the first-team as a substitute for the first time on 2 January 2010 in a 4–1 FA Cup third round victory over Hull City.

Later in the month, he signed a two and a half-year professional contract with the club. In January 2012, Nicholls extended his contract at Wigan until 2014. In between loan spells, Nicholls made his league debut on 27 October 2013 in a goalless draw away to Charlton Athletic.

Loan spells
Between November 2010 and May 2011, Nicholls was sent out on loan to Hartlepool United, Shrewsbury Town and Sheffield Wednesday, but failed to make a single appearance. On 24 February 2012, he joined Accrington Stanley on an initial one-month loan deal. Nicholls later made nine appearances for the club.

On 6 August 2012, Nicholls signed on loan for League Two side Northampton Town until the end of October 2012, and later re-signed on 6 November 2012 until the end of the 2012–13 season.

On 5 May 2013, Nicholls competed for Northampton Town in the League Two play-off semi-final second leg against Cheltenham Town. In total, Nicholls made 51 appearances for Northampton Town, achieving 20 clean sheets before returning to Wigan. On 11 September 2015, Nicholls joined League Two side Bristol Rovers on a three-month loan.

Milton Keynes Dons
On 3 August 2016, following the expiry of his contract with Wigan, Nicholls joined League One club Milton Keynes Dons, signing a two-year deal. Nicholls made his debut for the club on 9 August 2016, featuring in a 2–3 EFL Cup first round victory over Newport County. In his first season for the club, Nicholls' made a total of sixteen appearances in all competitions, achieving two clean sheets.

Following the departure of first choice goalkeeper David Martin, Nicholls took over the number one shirt for the 2017–18 season. On 29 December 2017, Nicholls signed a contract extension keeping him at the club until June 2020. On 6 May 2021, the club announced Nicholls was one of four players to be released at the end of the 2020–21 season, ending his almost five-year association with MK Dons in which he made over 150 appearances.

Huddersfield Town
On 26 May 2021, Nicholls signed for EFL Championship club Huddersfield Town on a two-year deal following the expiry of his contract with Milton Keynes Dons on 1 July 2021. He made his debut on 1 August 2021, keeping a clean sheet in a goalless EFL Cup first round draw with Sheffield Wednesday, with Huddersfield progressing to the next round following Nicholls' two penalty shoot-out saves.

He went on to have a successful debut season with the club, achieving 19 clean sheets and playing a key role in Huddersfield reaching the 2022 EFL Championship play-off Final. Nicholls was later named in both the EFL Championship Team of the Season and Professional Footballers' Association Team of the Year.

International career
In 2010, Nicholls was named in the England U19 squad that reached the semi-finals of the UEFA European Under-19 Championships, but did not make an appearance in the tournament. He made his debut for the team in February 2011 in a 1–0 defeat against Germany.

Career statistics

Honours
Bristol Rovers
Football League Two third-place promotion: 2015–16

Milton Keynes Dons
EFL League Two third-place promotion: 2018–19

Individual
Huddersfield Town: Hargreaves Memorial Trophy (Player of the Season) 2021–22
Huddersfield Town: Blue & White Player of the Season 2021–22
EFL Championship Team of the Season: 2021–22
PFA Team of the Year: 2021–22 Championship

References

External links

Profile at TheFA.com

1992 births
Living people
People from Huyton
English footballers
England youth international footballers
Association football goalkeepers
Wigan Athletic F.C. players
Hartlepool United F.C. players
Shrewsbury Town F.C. players
Sheffield Wednesday F.C. players
Accrington Stanley F.C. players
Bristol Rovers F.C. players
Northampton Town F.C. players
English Football League players
Milton Keynes Dons F.C. players
Huddersfield Town A.F.C. players